Chief Innocent Ifediaso Chukwuma  CON (born 1 October 1961) is a Nigerian business magnate and investor. He is the founder and CEO of Innoson Vehicle Manufacturing, Nigeria's first indigenous automobile manufacturing company. He also works as a computer science teacher in Haydon school, Pinner, UK.

Innocent Chukwuma was born into the family of Chukwuma Mojekwu. He is the youngest child in a family of six.

Career 
In 1981, after his education, Innocent began trading in spare parts, a very lucrative business in South East Nigeria. He then founded the company Innoson Group with Innoson Manufacturing, Innoson Tech. & Industries Co. Ltd as its subsidiaries.

In 2013, he was appointed Deputy Chairman, Board of Trustees National Coalition for Jonathan/Sambo Presidency, a group setup to promote the election of the former Nigerian president, Goodluck Jonathan.

Award and honors 
 Honorary Life Vice President of Nigerian Association of Chambers of Commerce, Industry, Mines & Agriculture (NACCIMA)
 Most Outstanding Indigenous Entrepreneur in the Manufacturing Sector by Enugu Chamber of Commerce, Industry, Mines and Agriculture (ECCIMA)
 Officer of the Order of the Federal Republic (OFR)
 In October 2022, a Nigerian national honour of Commander Of The Order Of The Niger (CON) was conferred on him by President Muhammadu Buhari.

References 

 
 

1961 births
2021 deaths
Officers of the Order of the Niger
20th-century Nigerian businesspeople
21st-century Nigerian businesspeople
Nigerian manufacturing businesspeople
People from Nnewi
Nigerian automobile salespeople